General Yun Chi-wang (윤치왕, 尹致旺) (February 16, 1895 – December 21, 1982) was a South Korean politician, soldier and gynecologist. He was the half brother of Yun Chi-ho, uncle of Yun Posun (who was the fourth president of South Korea), and cousin of Yun Chi-young. His nickname was Namppo (남포, 南圃), and his courtesy name was Seongun (성운, 聖雲).

Life 
Yun Chi-wang's father was Yun Ung-nyeol (1840–1911); his mother was Kim Jung-soon (1876–1959), his father's concubine. He had a half-brother Yun Chi-ho (1865–1945), some thirty years his elder, whose mother was their father's wife, Lee Jung-Mu (1844~1936).

In 1911, he entered Suwan Agricultural High School, but in 1912 he dropped out, and in 1913 went to participate in independent activities in China. In 1914, on Kim Kyu-sik's advice, he went to study at the University of Glasgow.

From 1927 to 1944 he worked at Severance Hospital in his homeland, and in 1938 became its second Director. He was also Chairman of Korea's Maternity Society.

In 1948 he enlisted in the South Korean Army as a medical officer with the rank of lieutenant colonel. In 1950, he participated in the Korean War. In March 1959 he retired with the rank of lieutenant general, and took full retirement in 1960.

Books 
 Dysmenorrhea
 Health of Nation and Peoples

See also 
 Yun Chi-ho
 Yun Ung-nyeol
 Yun Bo-seon

References

External links 
 Yun Chi-wang:Korean historical person information  
 고 윤치왕 교수/곽현모 명예교수 대한의학회 명예의 전당 헌정, 연세의료원소식 [657호] 
 군진의학의 토대를 다진 - 윤치왕 의사신문 2011.07.07 

1895 births
1982 deaths
People from South Chungcheong Province
South Korean civil rights activists
South Korean military doctors
Korean educators
Korean politicians
South Korean anatomists
Kim Kyu-sik
Yun Chi-ho
Seoul National University alumni
Alumni of the University of Glasgow
Emory University alumni
Yonsei University alumni
Korean anti-communists
South Korean gynecologists
20th-century South Korean physicians